William de la Pole may refer to: 

Sir William de la Pole (of Mawddwy) (died bef. 1319)
Sir William de la Pole of Hull (died 1366) 
William de la Pole, 1st Duke of Suffolk (died 1450)
Sir William de la Pole (1478–1539), son of John de la Pole, 2nd Duke of Suffolk, incarcerated in the Tower of London for 37 years

See also
William Pole (disambiguation)